Bethlehem is a city in Northampton and Lehigh Counties in the Lehigh Valley region of eastern Pennsylvania, United States. As of the 2020 census, Bethlehem had a total population of 75,781. Of this, 55,639 were in Northampton County and 19,343 were in Lehigh County. It is Pennsylvania's seventh most populous city. The city is located along the Lehigh River, a  tributary of the Delaware River.

There are four sections to the city: central Bethlehem, the south side, the east side, and the west side. Each of these sections blossomed at different times in the city's development and each contains areas recognized under the National Register of Historic Places. Norfolk Southern Railway's Lehigh Line, formerly the main line of the Lehigh Valley Railroad, runs through Bethlehem heading east to Easton and across the Delaware River to Phillipsburg, New Jersey. The Norfolk Southern Railway's Reading Line runs through Bethlehem and west to Allentown and Reading.

Bethlehem has a long historical relationship with the celebration of Christmas. The city was christened as Bethlehem on Christmas Eve 1741 by Nicolaus Zinzendorf, a Moravian bishop. In 1747, Bethlehem was the first U.S. city to feature a decorated Christmas tree. On December 7, 1937, at a grand ceremony during the Great Depression, the city adopted the nickname Christmas City USA in a large ceremony. It is one of several Lehigh Valley locations, including Emmaus, Egypt, Allentown's Jordan Creek, and Nazareth whose names were inspired by locations referenced in the Bible.

History

Settlement
The areas along the Delaware River and its tributaries in eastern Pennsylvania were long inhabited by indigenous peoples of various cultures. By the time of European contact, these areas were the historic territory of the Algonquian-speaking Lenape Nation, which had three main divisions, known by the dialects, the Unami, Unalachtigo, and Munsee. They traded with the Dutch and then English colonists in the mid-Atlantic area, in territory ranging from what became Connecticut, Long Island, and the lower Hudson Valley in New York, New Jersey, Pennsylvania, Delaware and Maryland.

18th century

On April 2, 1741, William Allen, a wealthy Philadelphia merchant and political figure, who later founded the city of Allentown, deeded 500 acres along the banks of the Monocacy Creek and Lehigh River to the Moravian Church. On Christmas Eve of that year, David Nitschmann and Nicolaus Zinzendorf, leading a small group of Moravians, founded the mission community of Bethlehem at the confluence of the Monocacy and Lehigh rivers. They came to set up missionary communities among the Native Americans and unchurched German-speaking Christians. They named the settlement after the Biblical town Bethlehem of Judea, said to be the birthplace of Jesus. "Count Zinzendorf said, "Brothers, how more fittingly could we call our new home than to name it in honor of the spot where the event we now commemorate took place. We will call this place Bethlehem.' And so was Bethlehem named after the birthplace of the Man of Peace."

Bethlehem was started as a typical Moravian Settlement Congregation, where the Church owned all the property. Until the 1850s, officially only members of the Moravian Church were permitted to lease land plots in Bethlehem. But a member of a group of families who were Huguenots also settled in Bethlehem. In the late 1700s, Bethlehem established grist and saw mills, known as Calvin's Mills. The historic Brethren's House, Sisters' House, Widows' House, and Gemeinhaus (Congregation House), with the Old Chapel, are remnants of this period of communal living.

The Moravians ministered to the regional Lenape Native Americans through their mission in the area, as well as further east in the New York colony.  In the historic Bethlehem God's Acre cemetery, converted Lenape were buried alongside the Moravians. In 1762, Bethlehem built the first water-works in America to pump water for public use.

In the autumn of 1777, during the American Revolutionary War, many patriots fled from Philadelphia to Bethlehem and the surrounding area as the British advanced in the east. The Marquis de Lafayette recovered from an injury received at the Battle of Brandywine in Bethlehem. Several of the most prominent members of the Continental Congress fled north to Bethlehem before the congress eventually reconvened in Lancaster. Before, during and after the American Revolution, Bethlehem was visited by George Washington and his wife Martha, Alexander Hamilton, Benjamin Franklin, John Adams, Samuel Adams, John Hancock, and the Marquis de Lafayette. On September 22, 1777,  fourteen members of the Continental Congress signed the Moravian Sun Inn register and stayed overnight.

19th century

In 1845, the prosperous village was incorporated into a free borough in the County of Northampton. After the Unity Synod of 1848, Bethlehem became the headquarters of the Northern Province of the Moravian Church in North America. On March 27, 1900, the Bach Choir of Bethlehem presented the United States debut of German Lutheran composer Johann Sebastian Bach's Mass in B Minor (1749) in the city's Central Moravian Church. Bethlehem was one of the four leading Moravian communities in the Northeastern United States (Emmaus, Lititz and Nazareth, each in Pennsylvania, were the three others). 

Bethlehem Township has remained a separate political entity. Even after the merger of the two boroughs, the township initially provided a count for the original sections.

After the Civil War, the Borough of South Bethlehem was formed. In 1886, the Borough of West Bethlehem (in Lehigh County) was formed. In 1904, the Boroughs of West Bethlehem (in Lehigh County) and Bethlehem (in Northampton County) merged.

20th century
In 1917, the Borough of South Bethlehem and Bethlehem merged to become the City of Bethlehem. Bethlehem Steel executive Archibald Johnston (1865-1948) was elected as the new city's first mayor.

Geography 

Because large volumes of water were required in the steelmaking process, the city purchased  of land in the Pocono Mountains, where its water is stored in reservoirs. The Lehigh River, a tributary of the Delaware, flows right through Bethlehem. The Monocacy and Saucon creeks empty into the Lehigh in Bethlehem.

Climate 
Bethlehem has a humid continental climate (Dfa). Summers are typically hot and humid, fall and spring are generally mild, and winter is cold. Precipitation is distributed fairly uniformly throughout the year, with thunderstorms in the summer, showers in spring and fall, and snow in winter.

Bethlehem falls under the USDA 6b Plant hardiness zone.

Neighborhoods 
Bethlehem is divided into five main areas: Center City, West Side, East Side, South Side, and North Side.  The West Side is located in Lehigh County and the other five neighborhoods are in Northampton County.
 Center City is bounded by Monocacy Creek to the west, Dewberry Ave. to the North , and Stefko Boulevard to the east.
 The West Side begins at the city's western border with Allentown and continues east to the Monocacy Creek and north to Hanover Township.
The Mount Airy Neighborhood is bounded by Pennsylvania Ave to the west, West Broad St to the north, 2nd Avenue to the east, and the Lehigh River to the south.
 The East Side is bordered to the west by Center City and to the east by Bethlehem Township and Freemansburg. The East Side includes the Pembroke Village area.
 The South Side's borders are Fountain Hill to the west, the Lehigh River to the north, South Mountain to the south, and Hellertown to the east.
 The North Side begins above Dewberry Ave and extends up Route 191 (Linden Ave) to Oakland Road, where the city and township divide is. Northside extends as far West as Monocacy Creek on Macada Road and as far East as Easton Ave and Stefko Blvd. intersection. 'North Side' refers more to a cultural division, than an actual boundary.

Demographics 

As of the 2020 census, there are 75,781 people living in the city. The racial makeup of the city is 72.7% White, 9.2% African American, 0.3% Native American, 0.0% Pacific Islander, 3.1% Asian American, 9.8% from other races, and 7.5% from two or more races. Hispanic or Latino of any race are 29.9% of the population.

As of the census of 2010, there were 74,982 people living in the city. There were 31,221 housing units, with 5.9% vacant.  The racial makeup of the city was 76.4% White, 6.9% African American, 0.3% Native American, 2.9% Asian, 0.0% Pacific Islander, 10.0% from other races, and 3.4% from two or more races. Hispanic or Latino of any race were 24.4% of the population.

As of the census of 2000, there were 71,329 people living in the city, including 17,094 families and 28,116 households. The population density was 3,704.4 people per square mile (1,429.9/km). There were 29,631 housing units at an average density of 1,538.8 per square mile (594.0/km). The racial makeup of the city was 81.85% White, 3.64% African American, 0.26% Native American, 2.22% Asian, 0.03% Pacific Islander, 9.44% from other races, and 2.56% from two or more races. Hispanic or Latino of any race were 18.23% of the population.
There were 28,116 households, out of which 26.3% had children under the age of 18 living with them, 44.1% were married couples living together, 12.8% had a female householder with no husband present, and 39.2% were non-families. 32.3% of all households were made up of individuals, and 14.4% had someone living alone who was 65 years of age or older. The average household size was 2.34 and the average family size was 2.95.

In the city, the population was spread out, with 21.0% under the age of 18, 14.4% from 18 to 24, 26.6% from 25 to 44, 20.1% from 45 to 64, and 17.9% who were 65 years of age or older. The median age was 36 years. For every 100 females, there were 91.5 males. For every 100 females age 18 and over, there were 88.6 males. The median income for a household in the city was $35,815, and the median income for a family was $45,354. Males had a median income of $35,190 versus $25,817 for females. The per capita income for the city was $18,987. About 11.1% of families and 15.0% of the population were below the poverty line, including 20.7% of those under age 18 and 8.8% of those age 65 or over.

Crime

Bethlehem has a lower crime rate than that of Allentown and Easton. In 2008, Bethlehem had an overall crime index of 244.4, while Allentown's crime index was 510.4 and Easton's crime index was 379.2. The United States' average was 320.9.

Economy

Bethlehem Steel

Bethlehem became a center of heavy industry and trade during the industrial revolution. Bethlehem Steel (1857–2003), founded and based in Bethlehem, was once the second-largest steel producer in the United States, after Pittsburgh-based U.S. Steel. Bethlehem Steel was also one of the largest shipbuilding companies in the world and one of the most powerful symbols of American industrial manufacturing leadership, and it manufactured over 1,100 warships used in World War II.

Bethlehem Steel began producing the first wide-flange structural shapes made in the United States and they pioneered the production of the now-ubiquitous "I-beam" used in construction of steel-framed buildings, including skyscrapers. It manufactured construction materials for numerous New York City and other city skyscrapers and major bridges.

The company became a major supplier of armor plate and ordnance products during World War I and World War II. After roughly 140 years of metal production at its Bethlehem plant, Bethlehem Steel ceased operations there in 1995, in the face of overseas competition and declining demand, and the company's liquidation was completed in 2003.

Wind Creek Bethlehem

In December 2006, Las Vegas Sands Corp was awarded a Category 2 Slot Machine License by the Pennsylvania Gaming Control Board. LVSC began work on the site, categorized as both the largest brownfield redevelopment project in the nation and the largest casino development investment made to date in the Commonwealth. Its mission was to create reinvestment and urbanization in the area. In 2007, the casino resort company of Las Vegas Sands began the construction of Sands Casino Resort Bethlehem, later rebranded as Wind Creek Bethlehem. The casino has been projected to bring in approximately one million dollars in revenue per day as of 2009.

Another major economic anchor to the city is St. Luke's Hospital located in neighboring Fountain Hill. That Hospital and Health Network is the second largest of its type in the Lehigh Valley. Other major employers include B. Braun, Lehigh University, and the Guardian Life Insurance Company of America.

Other companies in Bethlehem include the candy company Just Born. Zulily also has a large logistics operation in the city and serves the United States.

Shopping

Over the past two decades, many shops and restaurants have opened in the city's downtown and South Side. In the mid-1970s, West Broad Street between New and Guetter Streets in center city was converted to a pedestrian plaza. The buildings on the south side of the block were torn down and replaced by an enclosed mall and 11-story office tower. The tower, at One Bethlehem Plaza on the corner of Broad and New, continues to operate, but the 80,000-square-foot mall, which was erected in response to the development of suburban shopping malls, failed. Since then, the block has been reopened to traffic, and the mall has been converted into offices for PowerSchool, a major software company based in California, and the Internal Revenue Service.

In recent years, retail business in downtown Bethlehem, particularly along Main Street south of Broad, has experienced a renaissance, based on the city's historic character. The two-block shopping area is anchored by Moravian University's Main Street Campus and Central Moravian Church at the southern end and The Bethlehem Commons indoor mall and historic Sun Inn (1758) at its northern end. In between, numerous boutiques have opened, selling artwork, gifts, clothing, antiques, crafted beverages, gourmet foods, jewelry, hand cut crystal, holiday decorations, and other specialties. Among the blocks' additional attractions are the Moravian Book Shop (1745), the country's oldest continuously operating bookstore, and the historic Hotel Bethlehem (1922). Meanwhile, on the city's South Side, stores and restaurants have sprung up on Third and Fourth Streets, largely because of the presence of Lehigh University but also tied to the opening of the Sands Casino and the development of the SteelStacks Arts and Cultural campus.

Outside the center city there are several shopping centers:
 Westgate Mall, on Schoenersville Road, is an enclosed mall anchored by Weis Markets.
 Lehigh Center Shopping Center, on Union Boulevard near the Allentown border, includes Marshalls/HomeGoods, Staples, Giant supermarket, and Big Lots.
 Martin Court Shopping Center, on Eighth Avenue near Rt. 378, has Lowe's and PriceRite.
 Stefko Boulevard Shopping Center, between Washington and Easton Avenues, includes Valley Farm Market, Dollar Tree, and Pennsylvania Wine and Spirits
 Bethlehem Squares shopping center, on the edge of the city in Bethlehem Township, has Giant supermarket, TJMaxx, Wal-Mart, and The Home Depot.

Arts and culture

Christmas celebrations

Bethlehem has a long historical relationship with the celebration of Christmas, which is prominently celebrated in the city annually. The city was christened as Bethlehem on Christmas Eve, 1741 by Nicolaus Zinzendorf, a Moravian bishop. In 1747, Bethlehem was the first U.S. city to feature a decorated Christmas tree. 

On December 7, 1937, at a grand ceremony during the Great Depression, the city adopted the nickname 'Christmas City USA in a large ceremony that included Marion Brown Grace, the daughter of former South Bethlehem burgess Charles F. Brown and wife of Bethlehem Steel president Eugene Grace. Hundreds of citizens attended the ceremony and thousands more listened to the speeches and musical performances on the radio. 

Hotel Bethlehem was chosen for the ceremony because it was built on the site of the first building in Bethlehem, a two-room log house, where the original settlers conducted their evening worship on Christmas Eve 1741. As their benefactor, Count Zinzendorf, observed the farm animals that shared the space and listened to the settlers sing the hymn, "Not Jerusalem, But Lowly Bethlehem", he proclaimed the name of the settlement to be Bethlehem. The people gathered at the 1937 ceremony heard the same words when the Bach Choir sang the old German hymn, "Jesu, Rufe Mich (Jesus, Call Thou Me)", by Adam Drese.

The Bethlehem Globe-Times paid for the large wooden star erected on the top of South Mountain, at a cost of $460. The original star was created with four wooden planks, overlapped to create an eight-point star, 60 feet high by 51 feet wide, mounted on two wooden poles, and lit by 150 50-watt light bulbs. The installation of the star was done by PPL Corporation and the Bethlehem Water Department. The star was erected on the top of South Mountain, on property owned by the Water Department, located in Lower Saucon Township.

In 1939, the wooden star was replaced with a star made of Bethlehem steel, at a cost of $5,000. It had eight rays, with the main horizontal ray 81 feet wide and the main vertical ray 53 feet high. In 1967, the current star, 91 feet high, was installed on the old steel frame and set in a concrete base 25 feet wide by 5 feet deep. Plexiglas was installed to protect the 250 50-watt light bulbs. In the summer of 2006, the city repaired the base. A crew of municipal electricians changes the bulbs every two years.  Beginning in the mid-1990s, the star was lit from 4:30 p.m. until midnight, every day of the year.

Bach Choir of Bethlehem
Since its founding in 1898, The Bach Choir of Bethlehem has been attracting thousands of visitors to the annual Bethlehem Bach Festival, now held largely on the campus of Lehigh University and on the historic grounds of the Moravian Community. Other festivals include The Celtic Classic, which celebrates Celtic culture, food and music, and the SouthSide Film Festival, a non-competitive, not-for-profit film festival. The city has also been the past, and current host of the North East Art Rock Festival, or NEARFest, a popular three-day progressive rock music event.

Bethlehem Area Public Library
The Bethlehem Area Public Library is a popular destination for recreation and entertainment. The Banana Factory houses studios of area artists and is open to the public every first Friday of the month.  Touchstone Theatre, also on the SouthSide, houses the Valley's only professional resident theatre company, producing and presenting original theatre performances.

Musikfest

Bethlehem host Musikfest, the nation's largest free music festival, annually each August. The festival spans ten days, attracts roughly a million attendees from all over the world, and features hundreds of musical acts from all genres.

Steel Stacks
In 2011, the city opened Steel Stacks, a ten-acre campus on the former grounds of Bethlehem Steel, that showcases music, art, festivals, films and educational programming throughout the year. It is located in the backdrop of the blast furnaces of the former Bethlehem Steel plant.

Zoellner Arts Center

Lehigh University's Zoellner Arts Center offers a variety of musical and dramatic events through the year.

Other
On the first Friday of the month, the businesses of the Southside Shopping District hosts First Friday, a celebration of arts and culture. Stores, restaurants and art galleries stay open late and offer special discounts, refreshments, gallery openings and more. The Lehigh Canal provides hiking and biking opportunities along the canal towpath which follows the Lehigh River in Bethlehem. Both the Lehigh Canal and the Monocacy Creek are popular for sport fishing, and both are stocked annually with trout.

Sports

Rugby
The Lehigh Valley RFC rugby union team, founded in 1998, play their home matches at Monocacy Park.

Former teams
Bethlehem Steel FC, a United Soccer League team founded in 2015, played at Goodman Stadium at Lehigh University, until 2019, when it moved to Subaru Park in Chester, Pennsylvania after concerns about Goodman Stadium's lighting deficiencies went unaddressed.

The Lehigh Valley Steelhawks, a former Professional Indoor Football League, played home games at Stabler Arena in Bethlehem until they moved to Allentown in 2014.

From 1996 to 2012, the Philadelphia Eagles of the National Football League held pre-season training camp each summer at the football facilities of Bethlehem's Lehigh University.

In the early part of the 20th century, Bethlehem had a corporate soccer team, the Bethlehem Steel F.C., which won the 1918–19 championship in the National Association Football League (NAFL), and then won what amounted to national championships three more times during the next decade (1920–21 in the NAFL; 1926–27 in the American Soccer League I; and in 1928–29 winning the EPSL II). The Bethlehem Steel sides consisted largely of British imported players and also had the distinction of being the first American professional soccer team to play in Europe, which it did during its tour of Sweden in 1919. The team also won the National Challenge Cup, now called the Lamar Hunt U.S. Open Cup after billionaire sports franchise owner Lamar Hunt, five times beginning in 1915, and for the last time in 1926.

Parks and recreation
Bethlehem owns 39 park sites, encompassing .  Among the city's parks are Buchannan Park, Elmwood Park, Illick's Mill Park, Johnston Park, Monocacy Park, Rockland Park, Rose Garden, Sand Island, Saucon Park, Sell Field, South Mountain Park, Triangle Park, West Side Park, and Yosko Park.

Government

The city government is composed of a mayor and a seven-person city council. Mayor J. William Reynolds was sworn in on January 3, 2022. Federally, Bethlehem is part of Pennsylvania's 7th congressional district, represented by Democrat Susan Wild.

Education

Colleges and universities 

Bethlehem is home to three institutes of higher education. Lehigh University, located on South Mountain on the Bethlehem's South Side, has 5,000 undergraduates and 2,100 graduate students. The university, which was founded in 1865, was ranked No. 51 in U.S. News & World Reports ratings of America's best colleges in 2022.

Moravian University, located in the center city area, is a small, highly respected liberal arts college. Founded in 1742 as Bethlehem Female Seminary, Moravian is the sixth oldest college in the nation. Besides undergraduate programs, the college also includes the Moravian Theological Seminary, a graduate school with approximately 100 students from more than a dozen religious denominations.

The International Institute for Restorative Practices is a graduate school dedicated to the advanced education of professionals and to the conduct of research that can develop the growing field of restorative practices. The IIRP offers two master's degrees: the Master of Restorative Practices and Education (MRPE) and the Master of Restorative Practices and Youth Counseling (MRPYC). The IIRP also offers an 18-credit Graduate Certificate in Restorative Practices.

The main campus of Northampton Community College is located in neighboring Bethlehem Township.

Primary and secondary education 

Bethlehem public schools are managed by the Bethlehem Area School District, which covers a  area that includes the city, the boroughs of Fountain Hill and Freemansburg and two townships, Bethlehem Township, and Hanover Township. The district operates two high schools for grades 9–12, Liberty High School near center city, and Freedom High School in neighboring Bethlehem Township.

The district also has four public middle schools for grades 6–8: Broughal Middle School, East Hills Middle School, Nitschmann Middle School, and Northeast Middle School. In addition, BASD maintains 16 public elementary schools for grades K-5: Asa Packer Elementary School, Calypso Elementary School,  Clearview Elementary School, Donegan Elementary School, Farmersville Elementary School, Fountain Hill Elementary School, Freemansburg Elementary School, Governor Wolf Elementary School, Hanover Elementary School, James Buchanan Elementary School, Lincoln Elementary School, Marvine Elementary School, Miller Heights Elementary School, Spring Garden Elementary School, Thomas Jefferson Elementary School, and William Penn Elementary School. Lehigh Valley Charter High School for the Arts  is also operated by the district, though it accepts students in grades 9–12 from throughout Northampton and surrounding counties.

Bethlehem has two parochial high schools available to students: Bethlehem Catholic High School, which serves grades 9–12, and Moravian Academy, which serves all primary and secondary school grades. Notre Dame High School, located in Easton, serves grades 9 through 12.

Each of Bethlehem's three large high schools, Bethlehem Catholic, Freedom, and Liberty, compete athletically in Pennsylvania's Eastern Pennsylvania Conference and play their home football games at Bethlehem Area School District Stadium, a 14,000-capacity stadium that is one of the largest high school football stadiums in the state and has been labeled "a local football mecca."

Media 

Two daily newspapers currently serve Bethlehem. The Morning Call, based in Allentown, and The Express-Times, based in Easton. Other smaller newspapers include The Bethlehem Press, an award-winning weekly, Pulse Weekly, based in Allentown, Eastern Pennsylvania Business Journal, based in Bethlehem, and Lehigh Valley Sports Extra, an all-sports monthly newspaper founded in 2001. A Bethlehem-based daily, The Globe-Times, founded in 1855, ceased publication in 1991. 

Religious broadcaster WBPH is the only television station licensed in Bethlehem, though WLVT Channel 39, a PBS affiliate, has its operations in the city. WFMZ Channel 69, an independent station, is based in neighboring Allentown. Bethlehem is part of the Philadelphia media market, the nation's fourth largest, and its cable systems also receive select radio and television broadcasts from New York City.

Bethlehem has two licensed commercial radio stations, variety WGPA-AM and hard rock WZZO-FM. There is also one non-commercial station, WLVR-FM, operated by Lehigh University. Public radio station WDIY-FM, while licensed in Allentown, maintains its facilities in Bethlehem. There are numerous other stations broadcast from Allentown and Easton, representing a variety of commercial formats and several translators of public stations from Philadelphia and New Jersey.

Infrastructure

Transportation

Air

Highways

Interstate 78 is the most prominent highway serving Bethlehem. It traverses the southeastern corner of the city along an east-west alignment. U.S. Route 22 follows the Lehigh Valley Thruway along a southwest-northeast alignment through the northwestern corner of the city. Pennsylvania Route 378 heads southeastward from US 22 through the heart of downtown Bethlehem on a freeway, then transitions to surface streets as it crosses the Hill to Hill Bridge, following Wyandote Street southward out of the city. Finally, Pennsylvania Route 412 heads northwest from its interchange with I-78, following Hellertown Road into downtown, then a variety of city streets before coming to its northern terminus at PA 378.

Buses

LANta provides local bus service in Bethlehem, serving points in the city and providing connections to Allentown, Easton, the Lehigh Valley Mall, and other points in the Lehigh Valley. The Bethlehem Transportation Center at Broad and Guetter streets serves as a transit hub for LANTA buses in Bethlehem. Trans-Bridge Lines provides intercity bus service in Bethlehem, stopping at the Bethlehem Transportation Center and the Wind Creek Bethlehem bus terminal. Trans-Bridge Lines provides service from Bethlehem to Port Authority Bus Terminal in New York City along two routes, one of which runs from Allentown and Bethlehem to New York City and the other which runs from Bethlehem to New York City via Doylestown, Pennsylvania and Flemington, New Jersey. OurBus provides bus service from Bethlehem to Philadelphia and Camden, New Jersey.

Freight rail
Freight rail service in Bethlehem is provided by the Norfolk Southern Railway and Lehigh Valley Rail Management. Norfolk Southern Railway operates the Lehigh Line through the city along the Lehigh River, with the Reading Line splitting from the Lehigh Line in Bethlehem. Bethlehem formerly had passenger rail service at the Bethlehem Union Station, which originally served the Lehigh Valley Railroad and Reading Company and had service along SEPTA's Bethlehem Line south to Philadelphia until 1981, when service was cut back to Quakertown and later Lansdale. The Central Railroad of New Jersey formerly provided passenger rail service to the city at the Bethlehem station.

Utilities
Electricity in Bethlehem is provided by PPL Corporation. UGI Utilities supplies natural gas to the city. The City of Bethlehem Department of Water & Sewer Resources provides water and sewer service to Bethlehem and parts of 10 adjacent municipalities in Lehigh and Northampton counties, serving 35,000 water customers and 25,000 sewer customers. The city's water supply comes from the Pocono Mountains, with the surface water sources containing 10 billion gallons of freshwater capacity in an area consisting of 23,000 acres of protected watershed. Trash collection in Bethlehem is provided by private haulers while the City of Bethlehem Recycling Department provides recycling collection.

Notable people

 Jeff Andretti, former professional race car driver
 John Andretti, former professional race car driver in NASCAR and IndyCar Series
 Michael Andretti, professional racing team owner and professional race car driver
 David Bader, data science professor, Georgia Tech
 Chuck Bednarik, former professional football player, Philadelphia Eagles, Pro Football Hall of Fame member, responsible for The Hit, one of the most famed plays in NFL history
 Michael Behe, intelligent design advocate and Lehigh University biochemistry professor 
 Stephen Vincent Benét, former poet and novelist
 Josh Berk, children's book author
 Pete Carril, former professional and collegiate basketball coach
 Alexandra Chando, actress, CBS's As the World Turns and ABC Family's The Lying Game
 H.D., former writer and poet
 Russell Davenport, publisher and writer
 Jimmy DeGrasso, heavy metal drummer, Alice Cooper band and former drummer, Megadeth and Ratt
 Richard Diehl, archaeologist, academic and Mesoamericanist scholar
 Edwin Drake, first American oil driller
 Jonathan Frakes, director and actor, Star Trek: The Next Generation
 Mark Wayne Glasmire, country music singer
 Murray H. Goodman, real estate developer
 Eugene Grace, industrialist, former president of Bethlehem Steel
 W. R. Granger, former Canadian sports administrator
 John Valentine Haidt, German-born American painter and Moravian preacher
 Mel Harris, actress, ABC's Thirtysomething
 Mike Hartenstine, former professional football player, Chicago Bears and Minnesota Vikings
 Darrun Hilliard, professional basketball player, San Antonio Spurs
 George Hrab, progressive rock musician
 Dwayne Johnson, a.k.a. The Rock, athlete and actor.
 Archibald Johnston, industrialist, mayor, and civic leader
Daniel Dae Kim, actor, voice actor and producer
 Steve Kimock, freeform rock guitarist
 Gelsey Kirkland, ballerina
 Nathan Homer Knorr, religious leader and 3rd president, Jehovah's Witnesses
 Joe Kovacs, world champion, Olympic silver medalist in shot put
 Noel LaMontagne, former professional football player, Cleveland Browns
 Gary Lavelle, former professional baseball player, Oakland Athletics, San Francisco Giants and Toronto Blue Jays
 Richard Leibert, theatre organist in the 1920s-1970s
 Barry W. Lynn, executive director of Americans United for Separation of Church and State
 John E. Madden, thoroughbred trainer in National Museum of Racing and Hall of Fame
 Zach Makovsky, mixed martial artist fighting in UFC's flyweight division
 John E. McGlade, former chairman, chief executive officer and president of Air Products
 Alix Olson, spoken word poet
 Bob Parsons, professional football player for Chicago Bears
 Billy Packer, CBS basketball analyst
 Daniel Roebuck, actor, ABC's Lost
 Thom Schuyler, country music singer and songwriter
 Charles M. Schwab, industrialist, former President of U.S. Steel, later founded and was first Chairman of Bethlehem Steel Corporation
 Sheetal Sheth, actress, Looking for Comedy in the Muslim World
 John Spagnola, former professional football player, Green Bay Packers, Philadelphia Eagles and Seattle Seahawks
 Donald Smaltz, attorney
 Sarah Strohmeyer, novelist, creator of Bubbles
 Ross Szabo, wellness director and speaker
 Jonathan Taylor Thomas, actor, ABC's Home Improvement 
 Joseph Uliana, Pennsylvania State Representative and State Senator
 Melissa VanFleet, singer, songwriter, and musician
 David Zinczenko, founder and chief executive officer, Galvanized; author, Eat This, Not That

In popular culture

The 2019 Lifetime Movies' Christmas Radio is based in Bethlehem.
From 2015 to 2019, the HBO series Ballers about retired National Football League players, Dwayne Johnson's character Spencer Strasmore is from Bethlehem. Johnson attended high school at Freedom High School in Bethlehem.
In 2009, Bethlehem Steel was the filming location for the movie Transformers: Revenge of the Fallen. In the film, Bethlehem Steel's blast furnaces and the surrounding area appear in the opening sequences representation of Shanghai.
In the 1963 comic strip "Dennis in the Christmas City", a series of Dennis the Menace, Dennis' grandfather lives in Bethlehem. The comic strip has been reprinted frequently since its original publication.

Sister cities

Bethlehem's sister cities are:
 Corfu, Greece
 Foiano di Val Fortore, Italy
 Murska Sobota, Slovenia
 Schwäbisch Gmünd, Germany
 Tondabayashi, Japan

References

External links

Official website
Official visitor website
"Famous People from the Lehigh Valley," The Morning Call, August 18, 2006

 
1741 establishments in Pennsylvania
Cities in Lehigh County, Pennsylvania
Cities in Northampton County, Pennsylvania
Cities in Pennsylvania
Moravian settlement in Pennsylvania
Populated places established in 1741
Populated places on the Lehigh River